Yury Vyacheslavovich Afonin (born  March 22, 1977, Tula, RSFSR, USSR) is a Russian politician and member of the State Duma of the Russian Federation for the Communist Party of the Russian Federation. Member of the Board of the Youth Public Chamber of Russia.

Afonin was sanctioned by the United States Department of the Treasury following the 2022 Russian invasion of Ukraine.

References

External links
 Персональная страница на сайте КПРФ
 Персональная страница на сайте ЛКСМ РФ
 

1977 births
Living people
People from Tula, Russia
Communist Party of the Russian Federation members
Fifth convocation members of the State Duma (Russian Federation)
Sixth convocation members of the State Duma (Russian Federation)
Seventh convocation members of the State Duma (Russian Federation)
Eighth convocation members of the State Duma (Russian Federation)
Russian individuals subject to European Union sanctions